The Bob Hope-class vehicle cargo ship is a class of vehicle cargo ships, used for prepositioning of Army vehicles. The lead ship of this class is USNS Bob Hope (T-AKR-300).

Ships
  Laid down 29 May 1993, launched, 27 March 1997, delivered 18 November 1998. Named after Bob Hope.
  Laid down 15 April 1996, launched, 21 October 1997, delivered 4 August 1999. Named after Zachary Fisher.
  Laid down 24 March 1997, launched 25 June 1998, delivered 28 March 2000. Named after William W. Seay.
  Laid down 3 November 1997, launched 25 May 1999,delivered 30 January 2001. Named after Leroy A. Mendonca
  Laid down 29 June 1998, launched 29 January 2000, delivered 24 July 2001. Named after Herbert K. Pililaau
  Laid down 3 May 1999, launched 11 November 2000, delivered 11 July 2002. Named after Nelson V. Brittin.
  Laid down 15 December 1999, launched, 11 August 2001, delivered 10 September 2003. Named after Roy Benavidez

References

External links
 AKR Vehicle Cargo Ships at Navy Site

 
Auxiliary ship classes of the United States Navy
Auxiliary transport ship classes